Lorenzo Celsi (died 1603) was a Roman Catholic prelate who served as Bishop of Castro del Lazio (1591–1603).

Biography
On 19 July 1591, Lorenzo Celsi was appointed during the papacy of Pope Gregory XIV as Bishop of Castro del Lazio. On 10 August 1591, he was consecrated bishop by Ludovico de Torres, Archbishop of Monreale, with Agapito Bellomo, Bishop of Caserta, and Gaspare Cenci,  Bishop Emeritus of Melfi e Rapolla, serving as co-consecrators. He served as Bishop of Castro del Lazio until his death in 1603.

Episcopal succession
While bishop, he was the principal co-consecrator of:
Juan Pedro González de Mendoza, Bishop of Lipari (1593); 
Pietro Francesco Montorio, Bishop of Nicastro (1594); and 
Alessandro Guidiccioni (iuniore), Bishop of Lucca (1600).

See also
Catholic Church in Italy

References

16th-century Italian Roman Catholic bishops
17th-century Italian Roman Catholic bishops
Bishops appointed by Pope Gregory XIV
1603 deaths